Nicole Nönnig (born August 9, 1982 in Karl-Marx-Stadt, Saxony) is a former German figure skater.

Nönnig started skating at age 4 at the Chemnitzer EC club. She began as a single skater, and her coaches were Jutta Müller and Nils Koepp. 

In 2001, she switched to pair skating and teamed up with Matthias Bleyer. The pair was coached by Ingo Steuer in Chemnitz. In 2003, they won the silver medal at the German Figure Skating Championships and placed 8th at the European Figure Skating Championships.

Nönnig became a Bürokauffrau. She continued her education at the German Handelskammer to become a Betriebswirt and studied health management in Zwickau.

Nönnig and Bleyer were married in 2007.

Programs 
(with Bleyer)

Results

Pair skating with Bleyer

Single skating

References 

 
 Interview by the Paarlauf-Fanclub

1982 births
Living people
German female pair skaters
German female single skaters
Sportspeople from Chemnitz